Shadows of Blue is the 26th studio album by Donovan, released in 2013. It was recorded in Nashville.

Track listing
"Blue Jean Angel" – 3:05
"Resurrect Your Love" – 4:06
"To Love You" – 3:52
"River of Ruin" – 3:51
"Shadows of Blue" – 3:42
"Rock & Roll Gypsy" – 3:16
"The Loving of You" – 3:03
"The Blame Game" – 4:21
"The Harmonica Girl" – 4:22
"The Bungalow" – 3:06

References

2013 albums
Donovan albums